Jerry Johnson  (born July 11, 1977) is a former American football defensive tackle. After playing college football at Florida State, he was selected in the fourth round, 101st overall, in the 2000 NFL Draft, and spent two seasons with the NFL's Denver Broncos until being released in August 2002.

His sons, Jerry Johnson III and Chantz Johnson, also play football.

References 

1977 births
Living people
American football defensive tackles
Florida State Seminoles football players
Denver Broncos players